USNS Guadalupe (T-AO-200) is a  underway replenishment oiler operated by the Military Sealift Command to support ships of the United States Navy.

Guadalupe, the fourteenth ship of the Henry J. Kaiser class, was laid down at Avondale Shipyard, Inc., at New Orleans, Louisiana, on 9 July 1990 and launched on 5 October 1991. She entered non-commissioned U.S. Navy service under the control of the Military Sealift Command with a primarily civilian crew on 25 September 1992. She serves in the United States Pacific Fleet. In June 2004, USNS Guadalupe rescued 13 crew and a dog from the burning Taiwanese fishing vessel Hsin Chin Chanz, around 900 miles north east of Guam in the Pacific.

Design
The Henry J. Kaiser-class replenishment oilers were preceded by the shorter Cimarron class.

They were built without armaments but can be fitted with close-in weapon systems. The ship has a helicopter platform but not any maintenance facilities. It has a complement of eighty-nine civilians (nineteen officers), twenty-nine spare crew, and six United States Navy crew.

References

External links

 NavSource Online: Service Ship Photo Archive: USNS Guadalupe (T-AO-200)
 USNS Guadalupe (T-AO-200)

 

Henry J. Kaiser-class oilers
Ships built in Bridge City, Louisiana
1991 ships